Beattock railway station was a station which served Beattock, in the parish of Kirkpatrick-Juxta in the Scottish county of Dumfries and Galloway. It was served by trains on what is now known as the West Coast Main Line. Following closure in 1972, the nearest station is now at Lockerbie.

History 

Opened by the Caledonian Railway, it became part of the London Midland and Scottish Railway during the Grouping of 1923. It survived the closures in the 1960s, being closed as part of the electrification of the West Coast Main Line, the reason being mentioned by O.S Nock in his book as "the very small amount of traffic currently using it would not warrant the necessary rebuilding and safety improvements to allow electric trains to call."

Between 1881 and 1964, Beattock was the junction for the branch to Moffat.

Just south of Beattock station is the mysterious "Jessie's Tunnel", which intersects the line. There are 3 theories relating to the tunnel and its origin. One theory is that the tunnel was named after Jessie Armstrong, who died after being hit by a train whilst trying to cross the tracks. The more likely origin of the tunnel is that local boys would be labelled "jessies" (Scottish word for effeminate) for using it, rather than crossing the tracks. The third, and most controversial theory, is that the tunnel was named after Jessie, a local inhabitant, who used the tunnel to peddle her wares. This theory however is probably explained by local tavern rumour.Jessie's Tunnel

The station features in the novel The Thirty-Nine Steps, written by John Buchan. Richard Hannay walks to the station from Moffat, before catching a night-train south to England. There is a short story "Beattock for Moffatt" by Robert Bontine Cunninghame Graham about a Scotsman with consumption hoping to reach Beattock before he dies.

Stationmasters

William Lloyd ca. 1857 ca. 1862
James Chesney until 1863 (afterwards station master at Lockerbie)
Thomas Cowan 1863 - 1884 (formerly station master at Gallowhill, afterwards station master at Moffat)
James Dixon 1884 - 1887
William Napier 1887 - 1888 (formerly station master at Law Junction)
Inspector Robertson from 1888
George Donaldson 1903 - 1921 (afterwards station master at Ardrossan)
William Russell 1922 - 1924 (formerly station master at Dinwoodie, afterwards station master at Moffat)
David McVey 1924 (died 3 weeks after appointment)
J.R. Howie 1932 - 1939
David J. Murphy 1940 - 1944 (afterwards station master at Greenock)

Current operations 
Trains pass at speed on the electrified West Coast Main Line. The remnants of the station are still visible on the site. Following the trackwork associated with the electrification work, Beattock retained the down loop, and an up loop was created.

References

Notes

Sources

External links
 RAILSCOT on Caledonian Railway
 RAILSCOT on Moffat Railway
 Beattock railway station on navigable OS map
 Jessie's Tunnel

Disused railway stations in Dumfries and Galloway
Railway stations in Great Britain opened in 1847
Railway stations in Great Britain closed in 1972
Former Caledonian Railway stations
1847 establishments in Scotland
William Tite railway stations
1972 disestablishments in Scotland